Samrong is a BTS Skytrain station, on the Sukhumvit Line in Samut Prakan, Thailand.

Trial operation began in March 2017, and the station was officially opened by Prime Minister Prayut Chan-o-cha on 3 April 2017, with passengers able to ride the extension for free for a month beginning on 4 April 2017. It was the eastern terminus of the line, until the opening of the other stations of the Sukhumvit Line Extension (East) on 6 December 2018. In future it will connect to the MRT Yellow Line. It is one of only four BTS stations to have island platforms, with the other being Siam, Ha Yaek Lat Phrao and Wat Phra Sri Mahathat station.

References

See also
 Bangkok Skytrain

BTS Skytrain stations
Railway stations opened in 2017